The Boulder Mountains is a mountain range running north–south west of Boulder between Helena and Butte in the U.S. state of Montana. Parts of the range are in four different counties: Deer Lodge, Jefferson, Lewis and Clark, and Silver Bow.

Haystack Mountain, which reaches , is the tallest peak in the range. All four peaks are in Jefferson County.

See also
 List of mountain ranges in Montana

References

Mountain ranges of Montana
Landforms of Deer Lodge County, Montana